Iman Mersal (born November 30, 1966 Mit 'Adlan, Dakahlia, Egypt) is an Egyptian poet.

Life
Iman Mersal graduated from Mansoura University, and received her MA and PhD from Cairo University.
She co-founded Bint al-Ard (Daughter of the Earth), which she co-edited from 1986 to 1992.

She immigrated to Boston, in 1998, and then to Edmonton, Alberta with her family in 1999. Mersal serves as Associate Professor of Arabic literature at the  University of Alberta.

Her work has appeared in Blackbird, The American Poetry Review,Parnassus,The New York Review of Books, and Paris Review.  She has read at numerous poetry festivals around the world, including the London Poetry Parnassus, billed as the biggest gathering of poets in world history, where she represented Egypt.

Selected poems from Mersal's oeuvre have been translated into numerous languages, including English, French, German, Spanish, Dutch, Macedonian, Hindi, and Italian. These Are Not Oranges, My Love, a selection of Mersal's work translated into English by Khaled Mattawa, was published by Sheep Meadow Press, New York in 2008.

One of her poems was selected for inclusion in the volume Fifty Greatest Love Poems. Another ("Solitude Exercises") concludes a chronological anthology featuring 38 Arab poets spanning 15 centuries, from Imru' al-Qays to Mahmoud Darwish.

In her book How to Mend: On Motherhood and its Ghosts, Iman Mersal "navigates a long and winding road, from the only surviving picture of the author has with her mother, to a deep search through what memory, photography, dreams and writing, a search of what is lost between the mainstream and more personal representations of motherhood and its struggles. How to mend the gap between the representation and the real, the photograph and its subject, the self and the other, the mother and her child." The book was first published in Arabic by Kayfa ta and Mophradat in 2016, and the English edition was published in 2018 by Kayfa ta and Sternberg Press.

She lives with her husband, ethnomusicologist Michael Frishkopf and their two sons (Mourad and Joseph) in Edmonton, Canada. Mourad is currently a cognitive science major at Yale.

Works
2019. Fi Athar Enayat al-Zayyat  (In the footsteps of Enayat al-Zayyat). Cairo: Al Kotob Khan. 
2016. Kayfa talta'em: 'an al umuma wa ashbahuha (How to Mend: Motherhood and its ghosts). Cairo: Kayfa ta, Brussels: Mophradat. 
2013. Hatta atakhalla `an fikrat al-buyut (Until I Give Up The Idea Of Home) Cairo: Dar Sharqiyat, Beirut: Dar al-Tanwir.
2006. Jughrafiya Badila (Alternative Geography). Cairo: Dar Sharqiyat.
2004. Mamarr mu'tim yasluh lita'allum al-raqs (A Dark Alley Suitable for Learning to Dance), second edition, Cairo: Dar Sharqiyat.
1997. al-Mashy Atwal Waqt Mumkin (Walking As Long As Possible). Cairo: Dar Sharqiyat.
1995. Mamarr mu'tim yasluh lita'allum al-raqs (A Dark Alley Suitable for Learning to Dance), first edition. Cairo: Dar Sharqiyat.
1990. Ittisafat (Characterizations). Cairo: Dar al-Ghad.

Translation to Arabic
2016. ذبابة في الحساء. (A Fly in the Soup), Charles Simic, Iman Mersal, translator. Cairo: El-Kotob Khan.
2011. Bira fi Nadi al-Bilyardu. (Beer in the Snooker Club), Waguih Ghali, Iman Mersal, co-translator. Cairo: Dar el- Shrouk.

Works in English
2022: The Threshold: Poems. trans. Robyn Creswell. Farrar, Straus and Giroux. ISBN 978-0374604271
2019: Contributor to A New Divan: Lyrical Dialogue Between East and West 
2018. How to Mend: Motherhood and its ghosts. Cairo: Kayfa ta, Berlin: Sternberg Press. Translated by Robin Moger. 
2008. These are not oranges, my love: selected poems, Sheep Meadow Press,

Awards
 Sheikh Zayed Book Award, 2021

References

External links
"This Is Not Literature, My Love", Al-Ahram, Youssef Rakha, 11–17 February 2010
poets blog
A Poem by Iman Mersal 

1966 births
20th-century Egyptian poets
Egyptian expatriates in Canada
Living people
Mansoura University alumni
Cairo University alumni
University of Alberta alumni
People from Dakahlia Governorate
21st-century Egyptian poets
Egyptian women poets
English-language poets
20th-century Egyptian women writers
21st-century Egyptian women writers